Friherre Carl Gustav Alexander Cederström (5 March 1867 – 29 June 1918) was a pioneering Swedish aviator, known as  "the flying Baron".

Biography
He was born on 5 March 1867 to Anders Cederström and Maria Cecilia Wennerström in Södertälje, Sweden and he was baptized in Stockholm.

Cederström completed the program at the Blériot flying school in 1910. He became the 74th pilot in the world and the first to receive a certificate in Sweden. The next person in Sweden to qualify was Henrik David Hamilton. Cederström began teaching others to fly himself in 1912, opening a  flying school near Linköping.

Cederström died on 29 June 1918 with Carl Gustaf Krokstedt when their plane crashed in the Gulf of Bothnia.

References

External links

1867 births
1918 deaths
People from Haninge Municipality
Aviators killed in aviation accidents or incidents
Swedish aviators
Swedish nobility
Victims of aviation accidents or incidents in 1918
Victims of aviation accidents or incidents in Sweden